The 1952 United States House of Representatives elections in Virginia were held on November 4, 1952 to determine who will represent the Commonwealth of Virginia in the United States House of Representatives. Virginia gained an additional seat, having ten seats in the House apportioned according to the 1950 United States Census. Representatives are elected for two-year terms. Until this election, the Democratic Party had won every seat since 1932.

Overview

References

See also
 United States House elections, 1952

Virginia
1952
1952 Virginia elections